Pressure Cooker is a cooking competition television series on Netflix. The show has been described as a mix of Big Brother and Top Chef. Contestants included chefs Renee Blackman and Robbie Jester.

References

External links 
 

2020s American reality television series
2023 American television series debuts
Cooking competitions in the United States
English-language Netflix original programming